The Shemshak Formation is a Mesozoic geologic group in Iran. It dates from the Late Triassic into the Middle Jurassic, is up to 4000m thick and primarily consists of siliciclastic sediments. Fossil theropod tracks have been reported from Dansirit Formation.

See also

 List of dinosaur-bearing rock formations
 List of stratigraphic units with theropod tracks

Footnotes

References
 Weishampel, David B.; Dodson, Peter; and Osmólska, Halszka (eds.): The Dinosauria, 2nd, Berkeley: University of California Press. 861 pp. .

Triassic System of Asia
Jurassic System of Asia